Phyllanthus manono, also known as manono or mahame in Tahitian, is a species of small tree in the family Phyllanthaceae. It is endemic to the Windward Society Islands in French Polynesia, where it is found on the islands of Tahiti and Moorea. Compared to other species of Phyllanthus in the Society Islands, P. manono is found in relatively low-elevation areas, including some disturbed environments.

References

Flora of French Polynesia
Vulnerable plants
manono
Flora of the Society Islands
Taxonomy articles created by Polbot
Taxa named by Johannes Müller Argoviensis
Taxa named by Henri Ernest Baillon
Taxobox binomials not recognized by IUCN